The 31st Cannes Film Festival was held from 16 to 30 May 1978. The Palme d'Or went to the L'albero degli zoccoli by Ermanno Olmi. This festival saw the introduction of a new non-competitive section, 'Un Certain Regard', which replaces 'Les Yeux Fertiles' (1975-1977), 'L'Air du temps' and 'Le Passé composé'.

The festival opened with Moy laskovyy i nezhnyy zver, directed by Emil Loteanu and closed with Fedora, directed by Billy Wilder.

Jury 
The following people were appointed as the Jury of the 1978 feature film competition:

Feature films
Alan J. Pakula (USA) Jury President
Franco Brusati (Italy)
François Chalais (France)
Michel Ciment (France)
Claude Goretta (Switzerland)
Andrei Konchalovsky (Soviet Union)
Harry Saltzman (USA)
Liv Ullmann (Norway)
Georges Wakhévitch (France)

Official selection

In competition - Feature film
The following feature films competed for the Palme d'Or:

Blindfolded Eyes (Los ojos vendados) by Carlos Saura
Bravo maestro by Rajko Grlić
Bye Bye Monkey (Ciao maschio) by Marco Ferreri
The Chant of Jimmie Blacksmith by Fred Schepisi
Coming Home by Hal Ashby
Despair by Rainer Werner Fassbinder
A Dream of Passion (Kravgi gynaikon) by Jules Dassin
Ecce bombo by Nanni Moretti
Empire of Passion (Ai no Bōrei) by Nagisa Ōshima
A Hunting Accident (Moy laskovyy i nezhnyy zver) by Emil Loteanu
The Left-Handed Woman (Die linkshändige Frau) by Peter Handke
Midnight Express by Alan Parker
Molière by Ariane Mnouchkine
Pretty Baby by Louis Malle
The Recourse to the Method (El recurso del método) by Miguel Littín
The Remains from the Shipwreck (Los restos del naufragio) by Ricardo Franco
The Shout by Jerzy Skolimowski
Spiral (Spirala) by Krzysztof Zanussi
The Tree of Wooden Clogs (L'albero degli zoccoli) by Ermanno Olmi
An Unmarried Woman by Paul Mazursky
A Very Moral Night (Egy erkölcsös éjszaka) by Károly Makk
Violette Nozière by Claude Chabrol
Who'll Stop the Rain by Karel Reisz

Un Certain Regard
The following films were selected for the competition of Un Certain Regard:

 Un balcon en forêt by Michel Mitrani
 Dossier 51 (Le dossier 51) by Michel Deville
 Colonel Delmira Gouveia by Geraldo Sarno
 Grand hôtel des palmes by Memè Perlini
 Hitler: A Film from Germany (Hitler - ein Film aus Deutschland) by Hans-Jürgen Syberberg
 Koko: A Talking Gorilla (Koko, le gorille qui parle) by Barbet Schroeder
 Man of Marble (Człowiek z marmuru) by Andrzej Wajda
 Nahapet by Henrik Malyan
 The New Klan: Heritage of Hate by Leslie Shatz, Eleanor Bingham
 Ocana, an Intermittent Portrait (Ocaña, retrat intermitent) by Ventura Pons
 Oh the Days! (Alyam, alyam) by Ahmed El Maanouni
 People Not as Bad as They Seem (Aika hyvä ihmiseksi) by Rauni Mollberg
 Die Rückkehr des alten Herrn by Vojtěch Jasný

Films out of competition
The following films were selected to be screened out of competition:
 Fedora by Billy Wilder
 The Last Waltz by Martin Scorsese

Short film competition
The following short films competed for the Short Film Palme d'Or:

Christmas Morning by Tiernan MacBride
A Doonesbury Special by John Hubley
Letter to a Friend by Sonia Hofmann 
Maladie by Paul Vecchiali
Oh My Darling by Børge Ring
The Oriental Nightfish by Ian Emes
Le Serpentine d'oro by Anna Maria Tatò
La Traversée de l'Atlantique à la rame by Jean-François Laguionie
Uj lakok by Liviusz Gyulai

Parallel sections

International Critics' Week
The following feature films were screened for the 17th International Critics' Week (17e Semaine de la Critique):
 Alambrista! by Robert Young (United States)
 A Breach in the Wall (Une Brèche dans le mur) by Jillali Ferhati (Morocco)
 Fragrance of Wild Flowers (Miris poljskog cveca) by Srđan Karanović (Yugoslavia)
 Jubilee by Derek Jarman (United Kingdom)
 One and One (En och en) by Erland Josephson, Sven Nykvist & Ingrid Thulin (Sweden)
 Roberte by Robert Zucca (France)
 This Is the Night (Per questa notte) by Carlo di Carlo (Italy)
  (Die Frau gegenüber) by Hans Noever (West Germany)

Directors' Fortnight
The following films were screened for the 1978 Directors' Fortnight (Quinzaine des Réalizateurs):

 Alicia en la España de las maravillas by Jordi Feliu
 Bilbao by Bigas Luna
 Fine Manners (Les belles manières) by Jean-Claude Guiguet
 Los Gaminos by Ciro Duran
 The Getting of Wisdom by Bruce Beresford
 Girlfriends by Claudia Weill
  by Reinhard Hauff
 Los Hijos de Fierro by Fernando Solanas
 The Holy Alliance (A Santa Aliança) by Eduardo Geada
 Insiang by Lino Brocka
 The Mafu Cage by Karen Arthur
 Mother and Daughter (Maternale) by Giovanna Gagliardo
 Oka Oori Katha by Mrinal Sen
 One and One (En och en) by Erland Josephson, Sven Nykvist, Ingrid Thulin
  (El regno di Napoli) by Werner Schroeter
 Renaldo and Clara by Bob Dylan
 Rocking Horse (Susetz) by Yaky Yosha
 The Scenic Route by Mark Rappaport
 A Summer Rain (Chuvas de Verão) by Carlos Diegues
 I Vecchi e I Giovani by Marco Leto
 Zoo Zéro by Alain Fleischer

Awards

Official awards
The following films and people received the 1978 Official selection awards:
Palme d'Or: L'albero degli zoccoli by Ermanno Olmi
Grand Prix:
Ciao maschio by Marco Ferreri
The Shout by Jerzy Skolimowski
Best Director: Nagisa Ōshima for Ai no Bōrei
Best Actress: Jill Clayburgh for An Unmarried Woman & Isabelle Huppert for Violette Nozière
Best Actor: Jon Voight for Coming Home
Golden Camera
Caméra d'Or: Alambrista! by Robert M. Young
Short films
Short Film Palme d'Or: La Traversée de l'Atlantique à la rame by Jean-François Laguionie
Jury Prize: A Doonesbury Special by John Hubley, Faith Hubley and Garry Trudeau & Oh My Darling by Børge Ring

Independent awards
FIPRESCI
 FIPRESCI Prize:
Man of Marble (Człowiek z marmuru) by Andrzej Wajda (Un Certain Regard - Unanimously)
Fragrance of Wild Flowers by Srdjan Karanovic (International Critics' Week)
Commission Supérieure Technique
 Technical Grand Prize: Pretty Baby by Louis Malle
Ecumenical Jury
 Prize of the Ecumenical Jury: The Tree of Wooden Clogs (L'albero degli zoccoli) by Ermanno Olmi

Trivia
Michael Ritchie's 1979 film An Almost Perfect Affair, a romantic comedy starring Keith Carradine and Monica Vitti, features several scenes shot on location in Cannes while the 1978 Festival was taking place. A number of prominent actors, directors and journalists who attended that year made cameo appearances in the film, including Rona Barrett, Farrah Fawcett, Brooke Shields, George Peppard, Paul Mazursky, Sergio Leone, Marco Ferreri, Rex Reed and Edy Williams.

References

Media
INA: Opening of the 1978 Festival (commentary in French)
INA: Chronicle of the 1978 Cannes Festival (commentary in French)

External links 
1978 Cannes Film Festival (web.archive)
Official website Retrospective 1978 
Cannes Film Festival Awards for 1978 at Internet Movie Database

Cannes Film Festival, 1978
Cannes Film Festival, 1978
Cannes Film Festival